Over the Hills and Far Away is an EP by Finnish symphonic power metal band Nightwish, released in 2001 by both Spinefarm Records and Drakkar Records. It is their first and only EP. It was released in the United States in 2004 by Century Media Records. The bassist Sami Vänskä would leave the band after the recording of this CD, due to musical differences between him and Tuomas. Sami would be replaced by the current bassist and vocalist, Marko Hietala.

Track listing

Spinefarm edition

Spinefarm European edition
This edition is identical to the Century Media Records version. It is sold in Europe, outside of Finland. It contains additional tracks (5 to 10) recorded from the live performance in Tampere (Finland) on December 29, 2000. These additional live tracks can also be found on the live DVD/VHS/CD From Wishes to Eternity.

Drakkar edition
The edition released by Drakkar Records contains a few additional tracks (track 5 to 10) recorded from the live performance in Tampere (Finland) on December 29, 2000. These additional live tracks can also be found on the live DVD From Wishes to Eternity A dual-side CD/DVD-Version was also released, which contained the video recordings to the live tracks on the DVD side.

2007 Spinefarm UK Reloaded edition

References

External links
Nightwish's Official Website

Nightwish